Don Kitchenbrand (also Kichenbrand; born 13 August 1933) is a retired South African football player who played in Britain for Rangers and Sunderland in the mid to late 1950s.

Nicknamed The Rhino by the club's fans, Kitchenbrand was one of very few players of the Catholic faith to play for Rangers between the 1920s and 1980s, between which times an unwritten rule was in effect; he was advised not to disclose his religion when signing. In his first season in British football (1955–56), he scored 24 goals in 25 league appearances to help Rangers win the Scottish League title. That goal tally included the only goal in a 1–0 win over Old Firm rivals Celtic on 2 January 1956, and a five-goal haul in an 8–0 rout of Queen of the South at Ibrox on 7 March 1956. Kitchenbrand didn't feature much for Rangers after that first season, having lost his place in the side to Max Murray, and left for Sunderland in March 1958.

He played 54 competitive games for Sunderland, scoring 28 goals.  In November 1958 he scored a hat-trick in a 4–0 win over Rotherham, the first hat-trick a Sunderland player had achieved in two years.

He returned to his homeland in 1960 to play for Johannesburg Wanderers and a number of other teams, before coming back to Scotland two years later for a brief spell at Forfar Athletic.

He played once for his country in March 1956, featuring in a South Africa representative side all consisting of British-based players and including Kitchenbrand's Rangers team-mate Johnny Hubbard. They played against a Scotland XI at Ibrox, losing 2–1.

As of 2019, Kitchenbrand and his wife were living in an elderly persons' complex in Benoni, Gauteng.

Honours
Rangers
 Scottish League: 1955–56

References

External links
 

1933 births
Living people
Rangers F.C. players
Scottish Football League players
Sunderland A.F.C. players
English Football League players
Forfar Athletic F.C. players
South African soccer players
South Africa international soccer players
South African expatriate soccer players
South African expatriate sportspeople in England
South African expatriate sportspeople in Scotland
Sportspeople from Germiston
Keith F.C. players
Association football forwards
Expatriate footballers in England
Expatriate footballers in Scotland
White South African people